The Set-Up may refer to:

The Set-Up (poem), a narrative poem by Joseph Moncure March; basis for the 1949 film (see below)
"The Set Up" (song), a 2004 song by Obie Trice
 "The Set Up", a song by Favored Nations from The Music of Grand Theft Auto V
"The Set Up" a book by Sophie McKenzie

Films and television 
The Set-Up (1926 film), an American silent Western starring Art Acord
The Set-Up (1949 film), an American film noir directed by Robert Wise
The Set-Up, a 1962 film in the British film series Edgar Wallace Mysteries
The Set-Up (1978), a student film by Kathryn Bigelow
The Set Up (1990 film), a Hong Kong film featuring Lee Lik-chi
The Set-Up (1995 film), an American crime thriller
The Set-Up (2019 film), a Nigerian crime thriller drama film by Niyi Akinmolayan
"The Set Up" (Parks and Recreation), a 2010 episode of Parks and Recreation
"The Set Up", an episode of Hunter

See also 
Setup (disambiguation)